Culpables is a 2001 Argentine miniseries, produced by Pol-Ka and aired by El Trece. It starred by Mercedes Morán, Diego Peretti, Alfredo Casero, Gabriela Toscano, Fernán Mirás, Soledad Villamil and Susú Pecoraro. It received the Golden Martín Fierro award.

Production
The miniseries was aimed to young adults, as previous productions by Pol-Ka such as Vulnerables and Verdad / Consecuencia. It was produced at a time when TV miniseries were being displaced by reality shows.

This miniseries was the first notable work in television by the actor Diego Peretti. He had worked previously in Poliladron, Rodolfo Rojas D.T. and Campeones, but as a secondary actor. It was also the first time that he did not play a character with a tic or a disability.

Plot
The miniseries is focused in a group of friends and their couples. Anibal and Daniela have two sons, and face a romantic crisis. Claudio and Adriana have no sons, and Claudio is unemployed. Perla, just divorced from an abusive husband, is married with Willy and has a lesbian daughter, Sofía. Chechu is a bachelor woman.

Reception
The miniseries received the Golden Martín Fierro award in 2001. It received as well other Martín Fierro awards: best miniseries, best lead actor of miniseries (Diego Peretti), best actress of miniseries (Gabriela Toscano), and best script. Alfredo Casero and Mercedes Morán had also been nominated as best actor and actress of miniseries. The program was nominated for best child actor (Nazareno Casero) and best director, but did not receive those awards.

Cast
 Mercedes Morán as Chechu
 Diego Peretti as Claudio
 Alfredo Casero as Aníbal
 Gabriela Toscano as Daniela
 Fernán Mirás as Willy
 Soledad Villamil as Adriana
 Susú Pecoraro as Perla
 Florencia Bertotti as Sofía
 Gloria Carrá as Romina

References

External links
 

Golden Martín Fierro Award winners
Pol-ka telenovelas
Argentine LGBT-related television shows
2001 Argentine television series debuts
2001 Argentine television series endings
2000s LGBT-related drama television series
Lesbian-related television shows